Lite-On (also known as LiteOn and LiteON) is a Taiwanese company that primarily manufactures consumer electronics, including LEDs, semiconductors, computer chassis, monitors, motherboards, optical disc drives, and other electronic components.  The Lite-On group also consists of some non-electronic companies like a finance arm and a cultural company.

History
Lite-On was started in 1975 by several Taiwanese Texas Instruments ex-employees.  The original line of business was optical products (LEDs).  They then branched out into computer power supplies by starting the Power Conversion Division. Other divisions were soon to follow.

In 1983 Lite-On Electronics issued initial public offering as the first technology company listed on the Taiwan Stock Exchange with Stock Code 2301.
In 2003 Lite-ON appoint Dragon Group as their sole distributor in Indonesia.
In 2006 Lite-On IT Corporation acquired BenQ Corporation's Optical Disk Drive Business to become one of the top 3 ODD manufacturers in the world.

In March 2007, Lite-On IT Corporation formed a joint venture with Koninklijke Philips Electronics N.V. for their optical disc drive division as Philips & Lite-On Digital Solutions Corporation (PLDS).

The transaction closed in 2020.

See also
 List of companies of Taiwan

References

External links

 
 Components, trading, and service site (US) 
 PLDS new site

Companies based in Taipei
Electronics companies established in 1975
Computer storage companies
Electronics companies of Taiwan
Taiwanese brands
1975 establishments in Taiwan